Isao Yamase (born 16 December 1954) is a Japanese biathlete. He competed in the 20 km individual event at the 1984 Winter Olympics.

References

1954 births
Living people
Japanese male biathletes
Olympic biathletes of Japan
Biathletes at the 1984 Winter Olympics
Sportspeople from Hokkaido
Asian Games medalists in biathlon
Biathletes at the 1986 Asian Winter Games
Asian Games gold medalists for Japan
Asian Games bronze medalists for Japan
Medalists at the 1986 Asian Winter Games